The flag of Jalisco was adopted in 2011. It is colored blue and gold and bears the State Emblem in the center. The emblem has a diameter of three-quarters the width of the stripes. The ratio of the flag is 4:7. Ribbons of the same colors may be placed at the foot of the finial. The flag is one of only two Mexican states that is not simply a coat of arms set against a white background, and it is the only one without any white at all.

Design and symbolism

The meaning of the colors of the state flag are as follows:

 Gold (yellow): do good to the poors.
 Azur (blue): serve the rulers and promote agriculture.

Other flags

History
After the independence of Mexico, Prisciliano Sánchez, governor of the Mexican state from 1825 to 1826, proposed a transitional flag for the state of Jalisco, which consists of three horizontal stripes.

In 2001, Luis Havas announced plans to create a flag for the Mexican state of Jalisco. He proposed the old flag of Manuel Rodríguez, consisting of two blue stripes and a stripe of gold with the State Emblem in the center; it resembled the flag of the New Galicia or Intendence of Guadalajara. A flag was adopted in February 2008, which was then replaced by the current one on 7 May 2011.

Historical flags

See also 
 State flags of Mexico
 Flag of Guadalajara

References

Flags of Mexico
Jalisco
Flag
 Flag
Flags displaying animals